(stylized in all caps when romanised) is a Japanese rock band currently signed to Sony Music Entertainment Japan. It was formed in 2017, when Ren Asahi invited three other members to form a gig. By 14 August of that year, they performed their first live at a club and released their first demo single, "". At the same time, they also signed to PCI records. They released their first full album, One, on 5 December 2018. Subsequently, on 24 July of the following year, they released their mini-album, Memories, and on 23 September, they switched labels to Sony Music, and released their second full album, Zoo!!, on 29 January 2020. Furthermore, they also collaborated with Kana-Boon on The First Take, in the latter's single, "Naimononedari". Following this, they released their third album Freak on 19 May 2021.

Their song "" was used as the opening song for the anime TV series Eagle Talon: Golden Spell in 2020. Their song "" was used as the opening song for the first season of the anime adaptation of Girlfriend, Girlfriend in 2021, with the song also released as a non-album single.

Members 
 Mossa (もっさ）
 Born 19 September 1994, she is the main vocalist, rhythm guitarist, and occasional songwriter. She formerly was a member of the band Kuuchuu Scoppy and performed covers as an utaite on the website Niconico under the name "Higa". Additionally, she also creates artwork for CD jackets and goods.

 Asahi (朝日)
Born 23 July 1990, he is the lead guitarist and songwriter for the band. Asahi is also active as the vocalist and guitarist for the band Contemporary na Seikatsu and is also active as a Vocaloid producer under the name "Ishifuro". The band is also active under his real name. As with Mossa, he also works on the artwork for CD jackets and goods.

 Fujita (藤田)
Born 2 August 1990. She is also in charge of the bass. Like Asahi, she also works as a member of the band Contemporary na Seikatsu.

 Kazuma Takei (カズマ・タケイ)
 He is in charge of the drums. Born 29 August 1989, he is also active as a support member for the band Contemporary na Seikatsu. Kazuma is also a former member of a band called Wagamama College.

 Ayaka Nakamura (中村郁香)
 Her real name is Ayaka Nakamura. Age not disclosed, Born April 22nd. She is in charge of the keyboard. She is also affectionately nicknamed "Mu-san". Ayaka participated from the first live as support and accompanied to tours, etc. Finally, she is also a former member of the band Gugaguga.

Discography 
Albums
 One (2018)
 Zoo!! (2020)
 Freak (2021)

Mini-albums
 Memories (2019)
 Memories2 (2022)

References 

Japanese rock music groups
Musical groups established in 2017
2017 establishments in Japan